Magdalena Lamparska (born 6 January 1988, Słupsk, Poland) is a Polish film and theater actress. In 2011, Lamparska graduated from the Aleksander Zelwerowicz State Theatre Academy in Warsaw.

Lamparska gained popularity in Poland with her role of Marta in TV series 39 and a Half (2008–2009). In 2020, she starred in the highly successful Netflix film 365 Days. In 2021, she was reported to be returning for two announced sequels to the film.

Filmography 
 Jutro idziemy do kina, 2007
 Tylko nie teraz/Tolko ne seychas, 2008
 39 i pół, 2008–2009
 Zero, 2009
 Możesz być kim chcesz?, 2009
 Na dobre i na złe (episode 432), 2010
 Hotel 52, 2010–2011
 Ojciec Mateusz (episode 76), 2011
 Sałatka z bakłażana, 2011
 Big Love, 2012
 True Law (episode 28), 2012
 To nie koniec świata, 2013
 Bogowie, 2014
 No Panic, With a Hint of Hysteria, 2016
 The Zookeeper's Wife, 2017
 365 Days, 2020
 Banksterzy, 2020
 The End, 2021
 How I Fell in Love with a Gangster, 2022
 The Taming of the Shrewd, 2022 
 365 Days: This Day, 2022
 The Next 365 Days, 2022

References

External links 
 
 Magdalena Lamparska at filmpolski.pl

1988 births
Living people
Polish actresses
Aleksander Zelwerowicz National Academy of Dramatic Art in Warsaw alumni
21st-century Polish actresses
People from Słupsk